Dame Lisa Marie Carrington  (born 23 June 1989) is a flatwater canoeist and New Zealand's most successful Olympian, having won a total of five gold medals and one bronze medal. She won three consecutive gold medals in the Women's K1 200metres at the 2012 Summer Olympics, 2016 Summer Olympics and 2020 Summer Olympics, as well as gold in the same event at the 2011 Canoe Sprint World Championships. At the 2020 Summer Olympics she also won a gold medal in the K2 500metres, with crewmate Caitlin Regal, and as an individual in the K1 500metres.

Early and private life
Born in Tauranga, Carrington was raised in Ōhope, a satellite town of Whakatāne in the eastern Bay of Plenty, and is of Te Aitanga-a-Māhaki and Ngāti Porou as well as European descent. She attended Whakatane High School, and Massey University in Albany. As a child she played netball and aspired to be a Silver Fern. She married her long-time partner Michael Buck in 2022.

Canoeing
In June 2009 she won a bronze medal at the World Cup regatta held in Szeged, Hungary, competing alongside Teneale Hatton in the women's K2 1000 metres event. In May 2010 the pair won the gold medal in the same event at a World Cup regatta in Vichy, France. In late 2010 she started working with coach Gordon Walker.

Carrington and Hatton won three gold medals at the 2010 Oceania Canoe Championships; they won the 500 and 1000 metres K2 events and were joined by Rachael Dodwell and Erin Taylor to win the K4 500 metres. The pair became the first New Zealanders ever to reach a World Championship A final at the ICF Canoe Sprint World Championships in Poznań, Poland. Their time of one minute 42.365 seconds in the semi-finals meant they qualified third fastest for the final of the K2 500 metres, however they finished the final in ninth position.

At the 2011 ICF Canoe Sprint World Championships in Szeged, Carrington won the gold medal in the women's K1 200 metres event; and became the first New Zealand woman to win a canoeing World Championship title. The result secured an Olympic qualification berth for New Zealand. She was also honoured with the Māori Senior Sports Woman of the Year Award.

Carrington represented New Zealand at the 2012 Summer Olympics in London. In the K2 500 metres, Carrington and Erin Taylor finished 7th, and in the K1 200 metres Carrington won the gold medal. At the 2012 Oceania Championships, Carrington won gold medals in the K1 200 metres and in the K2 200 metres with Taylor.

At the 2016 Summer Olympics in Rio de Janeiro, Brazil, she defended her gold medal in the K1 200 metres event and won a bronze medal in the K1 500 metres event. In doing so, she became the first New Zealand woman to win multiple medals at the same Olympic games. Carrington was the flag bearer at the 2016 closing ceremony.

At the 2019 Canoe Sprint World Championships in Szeged, Carrington won gold medals in the K1 500 metres and K1 200 metres events.

On 3 August 2021, at the 2020 Summer Olympics in Tokyo, Carrington won her third consecutive gold medal in the K1 200 metres event. On the same day, she and her crewmate Caitlin Regal won a gold medal in the K2 500 metres event. On 5 August 2021, she won a further gold medal in the K1 500 metres event. With her third gold medal, she became New Zealand's most successful Olympian of all time, with a total of six medals (one more than fellow canoeists Ian Ferguson and Paul MacDonald and equestrian Mark Todd), five of which are gold (one more than Ferguson's previous record). She is also the first New Zealand woman to win three gold medals at a single Olympics, and was referred to by the New Zealand Herald as the "Greatest of All Time (GOAT) in the boat".

Awards and honours

Carrington was named as New Zealand's senior Māori sportswoman and overall Māori sportsperson of the year in November 2012. In the 2013 New Year Honours, she was appointed a Member of the New Zealand Order of Merit for services to kayaking. In 2014, Carrington was named the NEXT Woman of the Year in the Sport category. At the 2016, 2017, 2018, 2019 and 2021 Halberg Awards, she won the Sportswoman of the Year, and in 2016 and 2021 she also won the Supreme Award.

On 11 February 2021, Carrington was named the most influential Māori sports personality of the past 30 years in the Māori Sports Awards 30 in 30 show, aired on Māori Television.

In the 2022 New Year Honours, Carrington was promoted to Dame Companion of the New Zealand Order of Merit, for services to canoe racing.

Sponsorship and advertising work
Carrington is an athlete ambassador for Beef and Lamb New Zealand, alongside Eliza McCartney, Sophie Pascoe and Sarah Walker. She is also an ambassador for Southern Cross Health Society.

References

External links

|-

|-

Living people
1989 births
New Zealand Māori sportspeople
Olympic canoeists of New Zealand
Canoeists at the 2012 Summer Olympics
Olympic gold medalists for New Zealand
Olympic medalists in canoeing
People educated at Whakatane High School
Sportspeople from Whakatāne
Dames Companion of the New Zealand Order of Merit
ICF Canoe Sprint World Championships medalists in kayak
Massey University alumni
Medalists at the 2012 Summer Olympics
Medalists at the 2016 Summer Olympics
Ngāti Porou people
Te Aitanga-a-Māhaki people
Canoeists at the 2016 Summer Olympics
New Zealand female canoeists
Olympic bronze medalists for New Zealand
Canoeists at the 2020 Summer Olympics
Medalists at the 2020 Summer Olympics
Sporting dames